Wind power in Maryland, which has land-based and offshore resources, is in the early stages of development. As of 2016, Maryland has 191 megawatts (MW) of wind powered electricity generating capacity, responsible for 1.4% of in-state generated electricity. Two offshore wind farm projects that will supply wind-generated power to the state are underway.

Regulatory environment
As of 2015, development of projects had been partially hindered by the uncertainty of state government direction since the Maryland General Assembly and local governments are considering banning certain areas. Legislation to do so was not signed by the governor.

The Maryland Offshore Wind Energy Act of 2013 is a legislation to encourage the development of up to 500 MW of offshore wind capacity, authorized $1.7 billion in subsidies for the next 20 years for Maryland offshore wind development.

Land-based projects
Criterion Wind Project
Great Bay Wind Energy Center is a proposed wind farm that will utilize coastal winds in Somerset County The $200-million, 150-megawatt  facility is being undertaken by Texas-based Pioneer Green Energy which proposes to Initially build twenty-five  wind turbines. A second phase would add another 25 turbines. A single turbine has been proposed as a demo to overcome public adversion to the project.

Offshore projects
An area of 94 square nautical miles (79,706 acres) approximately 10–30 miles off the Maryland coast has been identified as suitable for offshore wind development. This was split into two (north and south) lease areas and auctioned by the Bureau of Ocean Energy Management (BOEM) on August 19, 2014. The Maryland Wind Energy Area is located, at its closest point, about 10 nautical miles offshore Ocean City in the Outer Continental Shelf of Atlantic Ocean and has the potential to support between 850 and 1450 megawatts of commercial wind generation.

Marwin 
In 2014, US Wind, a subsidiary of Italy-based Renexia SpA, won the auction for a 25-year leases for both areas issued by the BOEM with a bid of $8.7 million for areas. Development of their project is hindered by the uncertainty of government direction since the state legislature and local governments are considering banning certain areas. As of the summer of 2016 US Wind has completed underwater surveys of the potential sites about a dozen miles off the coast of Maryland and is submitting plans for environmental review by year end.

Skipjack
The 120 MW Skipjack Wind Farm off Delaware's coast is scheduled for commissioning in 2022. It will use Haliade-X turbines, with rotors 220 meters long, made in Cherbourg, France.

Ørsted U.S. Offshore Wind will partner with a logistics center in Maryland to create a 50-acre staging center for offshore wind manufacturing, capable of servicing projects up and down the East Coast. The developer will work with Tradepoint Atlantic, based in Port of Baltimore, to develop a staging area for on-land assembly, storage and loading out into deep waters.

The Port of Paulsboro on the Delaware River in New Jersey could become the production site for the enormous concrete foundations for turbines.

Ørsted has proposed using 1.5 acres of land at Fenwick Island State Park in Delaware as a transmission point.

Statistics

See also

Atlantic Wind Connection
PJM Interconnection
List of power stations in Maryland
Solar power in Maryland
Wind power in Delaware
List of offshore wind farms in the United States

References

External links
BOEM Maryland
US Department of ENergy Renewable Energy Small Wind Electric Systems A Maryland Consumer’s Guide

 
.
Science and technology in Maryland